Kodaka (written: 小高 or こだか in hiragana) is a Japanese surname. Notable people with the surname include:

, Japanese professional wrestler
, Japanese manga artist
, Japanese video game writer
, Japanese video game composer
, Japanese television personality

See also
, protagonist of the light novel series Boku wa Tomodachi ga Sukunai

Japanese-language surnames